Andrei Sergeyevich Klimenko (born 4 September 1978) is a former Russian professional football player.

Club career
He played 5 seasons in the Russian Football National League for FC Ural Yekaterinburg and FC Metallurg-Kuzbass Novokuznetsk.

Honours
 Russian Second Division Zone East best midfielder: 2004.

References

External links
 

1978 births
People from Yuzhno-Sakhalinsk
Living people
Russian footballers
Association football midfielders
FC Dynamo Barnaul players
FC Ural Yekaterinburg players
FC Sakhalin Yuzhno-Sakhalinsk players
FC Novokuznetsk players
Sportspeople from Sakhalin Oblast